The Governor of Limerick was a military officer who commanded the garrison at Limerick in Ireland.

List of governors

 William de Burgh
 1651: Hugh O'Neal
 1651 - 1653: Sir Hardress Waller 
 1653 - 1659: Sir Henry Ingoldsby, 1st Baronet 
 1690: Alexandre de Rainier de Droue, Marquis de Boisseleau (Jacobite)
c.1693: John Simpson
c.1726: Thomas Pierse
 Sir William King
 1751 - 1760: Sir John Cope
 1761: The Duke of Argyll
 1770: John Hale
 1775: Sir Henry Clinton
 10 July 1794: Gerard Lake
 1797–1804: The Lord Clarina
 23 May 1804: William Fawcett
 4 October 1826: William Knollys
 20 March 1834: The post was abolished on the death of Knollys.

References

Sources
 
 

History of Limerick (city)
Limerick
1834 disestablishments in the United Kingdom